Virginio Simonelli (born January 31, 1985), simply known as Virginio, is an Italian pop singer.

He made his debut in 2006 in the Sanremo Festival's New Proposals category with the song Davvero. In 2011 he won the tenth edition of the Italian singing competition Amici di Maria De Filippi in the singers-songwriters category and published his record Finalmente. Between 2012 and 2023 he has released thirteen singles. He has sold more than 30,000 copies of his albums and won a Gold Wind Music Award.

Biography 

As a child, Virginio showed a natural predisposition to music. As a teenager, he learned to play the piano, sing, and compose his first songs, also experimenting with dancing and acting. After graduating from the Gobetti High School in his hometown, Fondi, he moved to Milan. There, he enrolled in the Nuova Accademia Delle Belle Arti (New Academy of Fine Arts), where he graduated in Graphic Design And Art Direction, getting in touch with producers Paolo Agosta (his professor) and Ivo Grasso, with whom he began collaborating.

First steps in music:  Sanremo Nuove Proposte  and the first album  Virginio  
In 2006 he took part in the 56th Sanremo Music Festival in the category New Proposals with a song written by him, Davvero that anticipated his first album Virginio, produced by Ivo Grasso and Fabrizio Grenghi. The album contains ten tracks and the lyrics were written by the singer along with Paolo Agosta, who also composed the music. The second single Instabile was released in May and the third one Novembre in October.

In 2010 he made his first experience as an author, writing with Paola & Chiara the tracks Milleluci and Adesso Stop!, of which he also composed the music, contained in their album Milleluci.

Winner of "Amici di Maria De Filippi" and the EP "Finalmente" 
In September 2010 Virginio passed the selections of the tenth edition of Amici di Maria De Filippi. During the contest Virginio presented  Ad Occhi Chiusi, Non Ha Importanza and Dolcenotte and won the competition in March 2011.

On March 8, 2011, he published his second studio album Finalmente promoted by the singles Ad occhi chiusi and Sale.
The album sold over 30,000 copies and it was certified gold and therefore awarded at the Wind Music Awards.

"Ovunque" and second experience in Amici 
On March 26, 2012, Virginio published his third album "Ovunque", featuring the singles Alice and La Dipendenza and a song, Catch Me, that Gary Barlow, leader of Take That, gave to Virginio, who translated it into Italian with the title Tu Mi Senti.

From March 31, 2012 Virginio attended the eleventh edition of Amici in a special contest, called Big, where former contestants of previous editions of the show challenged each other, but Virginio was eliminated during the 3rd episode.

In 2013 he composed and wrote for and with Laura Pausini the songs Limpido, in duet with Kylie Minogue, and Dove resto solo io.

2015-2019
In 2015 he was the opening act for one of the shows of Malika Ayane's Naïf tour and released the single Hercules, produced in San Francisco by Corrado Rustici and written with Andy Marvel, Dimitri Ehrlich and Jesse Harris. In the same year he was one of the authors of the lyrics to Raf's Rimani tu. In 2016, together with Andrea Ferrara, he wrote and composed the m music for Weird by Lorenzo Fragola.

In 2016, Virginio participated with a cover of Royals by Lorde to the compilation A.M.I. - Rarities of Artists for Amatrice was released. In 2017 he co-authored lyrics and music for Chiara Galiazzo's song Chiaroscuro.

In July 2017 he participated to the festival Symphonic Night Vol 2 Napoli Fantasy at Shibuya O-EAST in Tokyo, as the guest vocalist of Corrado Rustici's prog-rock band Cervello, an event from which a live CD and DVD entitled Live in Tokyo 2017 was released. In September 2018 she is part of the cast, at the Teatro Nuovo in Milan, of the musical event Buon compleanno Mimì, organized by the cultural association Minuetto in memory of Mia Martini, paying tribute to the artist with a cover of Il fiume dei profumi, a song written for her by Biagio Antonacci. In 2017 he released the single Semplifica, produced by Gianluigi Fazio and written in collaboration with Fazio himself and Edwyn Roberts, which was promoted live by Virginio during the 2018's edition of the Italian event Festival Show.

In 2018 he collaborated again with Laura Pausini with whom he co-authored the lyrics of Fantastico (Fai quello che sei), E.sta.a.te and Il caso è chiuso, he was then an opening act of five of Pausini's Fatti sentire World Wide Tour 2018 shows. In November 2018, he performed in Osaka at the "Italia, amore mio!" festival, an event organized by the Italian Chamber of Commerce that promotes made in Italy music, art, food and wine in Japan. In the same year, he released the single Rischiamo tutto and in 2019 Cubalibre, whose video inspired by Bernardo Bertolucci's The Dreamers, directed by Alessandro Congiu, was awarded as Video revelation of the year at the Premio Roma Videoclip 2019.

With a conference at the Chamber of Deputies in June 2016, it was announced that Virginio would collaborate on Parole liberate: beyond the prison wall, a poetry contest, conceived by Duccio Parodi and Michele De Lucia, reserved for people in prison. The winning poem, P.S. post scriptum, by then inmate Giuseppe Catalano, in fact, was set to music by Virginio and recorded and published in 2019. P.S. post scriptum was awarded Best Lyrics at the International Short Film Festival Tulipani di Seta Nera.

Between 2018 and 2019 he collaborated with Officine Buone, a non-profit organization that brings live music to hospitals, also participating in the MTV series Involontaria inspired by the project. On September 2, 2019 Virginio announced, during the 76th edition of the Venice International Film Festival, that he is the artist who won the SIAE's Per chi crea contest for the national and international promotion of Italian music, winning the production of a tour in the United States, planned for spring 2020 but currently postponed due to the 2019-2021 COVID-19 pandemic.

2020-today
In 2020, he participated in Tale e quale show (the Italian version of Sing Your Face Off) and took on the role of music artistic director of MP FILM, a film-music production company. In the same year he also signed the sound direction of Donne - Storie che ispirano, a docu-series about women with breast cancer by Italian TV channel LA7d, and of Manteniamoci Informate, an ovarian cancer awareness campaign. He also supported his hometown, Fondi, which became a "red zone" during the 2020 COVID-19 Pandemic in Italy with a charitable concert, Artisti ProFondi, streamed on April 2, 2020, featuring Marco Masini, Arisa, Noemi and other colleagues

In 2021 he released the singles Rimani (also presented in Latin America in its Spanish-language version Mañana in 2022) and Brava gente. Also in 2021 he co-wrote Ti vedo da fuori by Alessandra Amoroso, featured on the album Tutto accade.

Between February and April 2022 he co-wrote the song Quello che abbiamo perso by Giusy Ferreri, featured on the album Cortometraggi and he sang in duet with Bianca Atzei on Collisioni. In the summer he released the single M'incanta for Universal Music Italy[ and wrote with Daniele Coro Il panda con le ali, a song that participated in the 65th edition of the Zecchino d'Oro and was the winner of the event.

In September 2022, he announced, during the 79th edition of the Venice International Film Festival, his new single Non dirlo a nessuno, and its Spanish version No le digas a nadie, the main song of the soundtrack of Alessio Russo's film of the same name, in which Virginio also takes part with a cameo.[59][60][61] On December 11, 2022, he participated in and won the second edition of the Christmas version of the Italian TV program Tale e quale show with his performance as George Michael, singing Last Christmas.

In 2023 he collaborated in the creation of the song Un milione di piccole tempeste performed by Gianni Morandi.

Discography

Albums
2006 – Virginio  (March 3, 2006)
2011 – Finalmente (March 8, 2011) (ITA #4; Gold – 30,000+ copies)
2012 – Ovunque (March 26, 2012) (ITA #12)

Compilation
2011 – Amici 10 (with other contestants of Amici)

Singles
2006 – Davvero
2006 – Instabile
2006 – Novembre
2011 – Ad occhi chiusi
2011 – Sale
2012 – Alice (Elis)
2012 – La Dipendenza
2015 – Hercules
2018 – Semplifica
2018 – Rischiamo tutto
2019 - Cubalibre
 2019 - P.S. post scriptum
 2021 - Rimani
 2021 - Brava gente
 2022 - Collisioni feat. Bianca Atzei
 2022 - Mañana
 2022 - M'incanta
 2022 - Non dirlo a nessuno

Videos 
 2006: Davvero
 2006:  Instabile 
 2011: Ad occhi chiusi 
 2011: Sale 
 2012: Alice (Elis)
 2012: La Dipendenza
2015: Hercules
 2018 - Semplifica
 2018 - Rischiamo tutto
 2019 - Cubalibre
 2019 - P.S. post scriptum
 2021 - Rimani
 2021 - Brava gente
 2022 - Collisioni feat. Bianca Atzei
 2022 - Mañana
 2022 - M'incanta
 2022 - Non dirlo a nessuno

Tours
2011
Finalmente Tour
2012
Ovunque Tour
2017
Acoustic Live Tour

Other tours 
2011
Nokia Amici in Tour
Sete di Radio Tour
Radio Bruno estate tour
Radionorba Battiti Live
Company Contatto

Author and composer for other singers

Awards 
 2011 - Winner of the singer category of Amici di Maria De Filippi
 2011 - Gold Wind Music Award for Finalmente
 2018 - Premio internazionale Palinuro (International Award of Palinuro)
 2018 - Riconoscimento Giovanni Paolo II (Recognition Pope John Paul II) 
 2019 - Premio (Award) Roma Videoclip for Cubalibre
 2020 - Premio #SocialClip for P.S. post scriptum at Tulipani di Seta Nera 2020
 2022 - Premio speciale al Fara film festival (Fara Film Festival Special Award) 2022
 2022 - Premio persona dell'anno 2022 di Fondi (Person of the year 2022 of the city of Fondi)
 2022 - Zecchino d'oro as an author of Il panda con le ali

References 

1985 births
Living people
Singing talent show winners
People from the Province of Latina
Italian pop singers
21st-century Italian male singers